Pio Parolini (born February 19, 1940) is a retired Swiss professional ice hockey player who played for Zürcher SC in the National League A. He also represented the Swiss national team at the 1964 Winter Olympics.

References

External links
Pio Parolini's stats at Sports-Reference.com

1940 births
Living people
EHC Basel players
ZSC Lions players
Ice hockey players at the 1964 Winter Olympics
Olympic ice hockey players of Switzerland
People from Maloja District
Sportspeople from Graubünden